The Raiché Coutev Sisters were a small female vocal choir that performed exclusively for the soundtracks of Yoko Kanno. 

The group was formed by vocalists Gabriela Robin, Akino Arai, Wuyontana, and Koko Komine. They have been featured in the soundtracks for Macross Plus ("A Sai Ën"), Uncharted Waters ("A Siren Song"), and Turn-A Gundam ("Spiral Re-born", "Barbarian").

Ultimately, the "sisters" disbanded in 1999, with Akino Arai and Wuyontana pursuing solo careers, and Koko Komine leaving to sing for Yasunori Mitsuda's works.

External links
 

Japanese pop music groups